Joseph Palamara (born September 26, 1963) is a current Democratic member of the Wayne County Commission and a former member of the Michigan House of Representatives.

Education
During his undergraduate career at Michigan State University where he was an Evans Scholar, Palamara was a walk-on member of the baseball team. He led the Spartans in hitting in his senior year, won the team's Sportsmanship Award, and was All-Big Ten and All-America at second base. Palamara received his Juris Doctor in 1985 from the Detroit College of Law.

Philanthropic Work
Palamara is a former member of the Board of Directors for the Henry Ford Wyandotte Hospital and a former member of the Aerotropolis Executive Board.

References

1953 births
Living people
People from Wyandotte, Michigan
Michigan State University alumni
Michigan State University College of Law alumni
County commissioners in Michigan
Democratic Party members of the Michigan House of Representatives
People from Grosse Ile, Michigan